KAND (1340  AM) is a radio station that serves the Corsicana/Ennis/Waxahachie area, and is owned by New Century Broadcasting. This station runs a country music  format, and is also the home of Corsicana High School Tigers and Navarro College Bulldogs football games, and the latest news from the Texas State Network News, and CBS News. As of July 11, 2008, it airs sports programming from Fox Sports Radio during overnights and weekends. For many years, the KAND call sign was assigned to the station now called KWPW.

History
KAND began in 1937 as a Variety/Entertainment station on 1310 kHz but 10 years later moved to AM 1340 and has maintained its variety format until the 1980s when they made a slow transition to Country music. The original station owner was J.C. West, who also owned the Wolf Brand (canned) Chili plant in Corsicana. West had applied for callsign WOLF, but the Federal Communications Commission wouldn't permit it because the WOLF call letters are currently in use on Syracuse, New York's AM station.

In March 2008 Yates Communications announced FCC approval to buy KAND. Although the 1,000-watt station doesn't cover the immediate Dallas/Fort Worth Metroplex, KAND will be streaming online to North Texas listeners with a Real Country format that offers programs currently not available in Dallas.

On July 9, 2010; Yates decided to sell this station to New Century Broadcasting

In 2014, KAND shifted to country full-time and switched news sources from ABC News to CBS.

References

External links
KAND Radio official website
GreenRadio.net
 DFW Radio/TV History

AND
News and talk radio stations in the United States
Sports radio stations in the United States
Radio stations established in 1937
1937 establishments in Texas